Le Moyne is an unincorporated community in Mobile County, Alabama, United States. It was named in honor of the Le Moyne brothers, Pierre Le Moyne d'Iberville and Jean-Baptiste Le Moyne, Sieur de Bienville, founders of colonial Mobile.  Twenty-Seven Mile Bluff, on the Mobile River, is located in Le Moyne. The bluff is the site of the former Fort Louis de La Louisiane, capital of French Louisiana from 1702 until 1711.

Geography

References

Unincorporated communities in Alabama
Unincorporated communities in Mobile County, Alabama
French-American culture in Alabama
1702 establishments in the French colonial empire